Highgate is a ward in the London Borough of Camden, in the United Kingdom. The ward has existed since the creation of the borough on 1 April 1965 and was first used in the 1964 elections. The ward was redrawn in May 1978 and May 2002. The ward will undergo minor boundary changes for the 2022 election. In 2018, the ward had an electorate of 8,249. The Boundary Commission projects the electorate to rise to 8,415 in 2025.

History

In October 2019, during its review of the London Borough of Camden, the Local Government Boundary Commission for England (LGBCE) proposed removing Dartmouth Park from the Highgate ward. Dartmouth Park would be represented by two councillors while the rest of Highgate would be represented by one councillor. This was met with "anger" from local residents, and the LGBCE's final recommendations for Camden, published in February 2020, included only a single three-member ward for Highgate, accepting that "its previous proposal a two-councillor ward alongside a one-councillor ward would have divided local communities."

Councillors

Elections

Elections in the 2020s

Elections in the 2010s

Elections in the 2000s

Elections in the 1990s

References

Wards of the London Borough of Camden
1965 establishments in England